"Ugly" is a song from the album Next by American rock band Sevendust. Released in October 2005, the song had a fair amount of radio play.

The song was described by drummer Morgan Rose in an MTV.com interview as being a mixed bag with a "huge chorus, broken-down verses and really heavy bridges."

Music video
The video for the song directed by PR Brown, which depicted the band in a dark alley and civilians being lured into a laboratory where they get their eyes taken out. It was the first music video that guitarist Sonny Mayo appeared on it.

Chart position
The song reached #12 in the Mainstream Rock Chart.

Singles 

Billboard (North America)

References

2005 singles
2005 songs
Sevendust songs
Songs written by John Connolly (musician)
Songs written by Morgan Rose
Songs written by Lajon Witherspoon
Songs written by Vinnie Hornsby